Aspidiellina is a subtribe of armored scale insects. While the subtribe Aspidiellina was not mentioned in Takagi's 2002 study, the Aspidiotini were not deemed as problematical as the Diaspidini and Lepidosaphidini.

Genera
Arundaspis Borchsenius, 1949
Aspidiella Leonardi, 1898
Eremiaspis
Remotaspidiotus
Rhizaspidiotus
Stringaspidiotus
Tollaspidiotus

References

Insect subtribes
Aspidiotini